Bevanopsis is a genus of trilobites in the order Phacopida, which existed in what is now Virginia, U.S.A. It was described by Cooper in 1953, and the type species is Bevanopsis ulrichi.

References

External links
 Bevanopsis at the Paleobiology Database

Extinct animals of North America
Phacopida genera